Syneos Health (formerly InVentiv Health Incorporated and INC Research) is a NASDAQ listed American multinational contract research organization based in Morrisville, North Carolina. The company specializes in helping companies with late-stage clinical trials.

History 
In January 2018 INC Research acquired inVentiv Health, the parent company of a subsidiary, Syneos, and the resulting company was named Syneos Health.

In August 2018, Syneos Health acquires Kinapse, a leading provider of regulatory and pharmacovigilance services.

In November 2019, Syneos Health, partnered with AiCure to offer smarter clinical trials that optimise patient engagement.

In 2019, the company launched Syneos Health Communications, a new business unit dedicated to providing advertising, public relations, and medical communications services to biopharmaceutical clients.

In February 2023, Syneos Health and Haystack Health partnered to use AI and speed up clinical trials.

Awards 
In 2020, the company was named to Forbes 2020 list of World’s Best Employers.

References

External links 

Biotechnology companies of the United States
Companies based in North Carolina
Contract research organizations
Companies listed on the Nasdaq
Biotechnology companies established in 2018